Ida Mouride is an arrondissement of Koungheul in Kaffrine Region in Senegal.

References 

Arrondissements of Senegal